Hill Regional Career High School is a magnet high school located in the Hill area of New Haven, Connecticut, United States. Its original name was Lee High School, named after one of New Haven's most famous mayors, Richard C. Lee. The school's curriculum is aligned with national, state and district standards, as well as providing career exploration programs to prepare students for entry into the fields of business/technology and health/science.

Notable alumni

 Tony Sparano, former Head Coach of the Miami Dolphins

References

External links
 

Schools in New Haven, Connecticut
Public high schools in Connecticut
Magnet schools in Connecticut